Luis Gustavo Parra Noriega (born 4 February 1973) is a Mexican lawyer and politician from the National Action Party. From 2006 to 2009 he served as Deputy of the LX Legislature of the Mexican Congress representing the State of Mexico.

References

1973 births
Living people
Politicians from the State of Mexico
21st-century Mexican lawyers
National Action Party (Mexico) politicians
21st-century Mexican politicians
Deputies of the LX Legislature of Mexico
Members of the Chamber of Deputies (Mexico) for the State of Mexico